

N
 NABU - Ecst Container Services and Trading, GMBH
 NACR - Nashville and Ashland City Railroad
 NACX - GE Capital Rail Services
 NADU - North American Domestic Container Corporation
 NADX - GE Capital Rail Services
 NADZ - North American Domestic Container Corporation
 NAFX - GE Capital Rail Services
 NAHX - GE Capital Rail Services
 NALU - Norwegian American Lines
 NALX - Nalco Chemical Company; NASA Railroad
 NALZ - Neptune Orient Lines, Ltd.
 NAMX - NAMX Leasing Company
 NAP  - Narragansett Pier Railroad
 NAPX - North American Plastics, Inc.
 NAR  - Northern Alberta Railway; Canadian National Railway
 NARX - NORCHEM Incorporated
 NASX - NASA Railroad
 NATU - Nasso SA
 NATX - North American Tank Line; North American Car Corp.; General Electric Railcar Services Corp.; General Electric Rail Services Corp.
 NATZ - North American Transportation
 NAUG - Naugatuck Railroad
 NAVE - Navajo Express
 NB   - Northampton and Bath Railroad; Conrail
 NBCX - Nebraska Boiler Company
 NBEC - New Brunswick East Coast Railway
 NBER - Nittany and Bald Eagle Railroad
 NBIX - Bombardier Capital Rail, Inc.
 NBNR - Nicolet Badger Northern Railroad
 NBSR - New Brunswick Southern Railway
 NC   - CSX Transportation; Seaboard System Railroad; Nashville and Chattanooga Railroad
 NCAN - Incan Superior, Ltd.
 NCAU - Colonial/Atl, Ltd.
 NCAZ - NCA Leasing Company
 NCBU - Northbrook Container Leasing
 NCDU - Burlington Northern and Santa Fe Railway; BNSF Railway
 NCEU - XTRA Intermodal
 NCEX - National Car Systems, Inc.
 NCFX - GE Capital Rail Services
 NCGU - Genstar Corporation
 NCGU - TIP Intermodal Services
 NCHU - TIP Intermodal Services
 NCHX - GE Capital Rail Services
 NCIR - New Castle Industrial Railroad
 NCIU - North American Container System
 NCIX - Nova Chemicals, Inc.
 NCJU - North American Container System
 NCLU - China Ocean Shipping Company
 NCLX - Nova Chemicals, Inc.
 NCOK - North Central Oklahoma Railway
 NCPR - North Carolina Ports Railway Commission
 NCQU - TIP Intermodal Services
 NCRC - Nebraska Central Railroad
 NCRR - North Carolina Railroad
 NCRU - TIP Intermodal Services
 NCRX - GE Capital Rail Services
 NCRY - Northern Central Railway
 NCTC - North County Transit District
 NCTU - Northbrook Container Leasing
 NCTX - GE Capital Rail Services; PLM International, Inc.
 NCUU - TIP Intermodal Services
 NCUX - Newcourt Capital USA
 NCVA - North Carolina and Virginia Railroad
 NCWX - Northwest Container Services, Inc.
 NCYR - Nash County Railroad
 NDCR - NDC Railroad
 NDEM - Ferrocarriles Nacionales de México
 NDM  - Ferrocarriles Nacionales de México
 NDMZ - Ferrocarriles Nacionales de México
 NDT  - Ferrocarril Nacional de Tehuantepec
 NDYX - Dresser Leasing Corporation; First Union Rail
 NEAX - Nemic Leasing Corporation
 NECR - New England Central Railroad
 NECX - Mid-Am Equipment, Inc.
 NEFX - Northeast Corridor Foundation
 NEGS - New England Southern Railroad
 NEKM - Mid-Michigan Railroad (Northeast Kansas and Missouri Division)
 NELU - New England Express Lines
 NELX - Dresser Leasing Corporation
 NEMX - Ogden Martin Systems of Montgomery
 NENE - Nebraska Northeastern Railway
 NEPU - Neptune Orient Lines, Ltd.
 NERR - Nashville and Eastern Railroad
 NERX - Transportation Management Services, Inc.
 NERZ - GE Capital Corporation
 NETU - Netumar Lines
 NETX - Nemic Leasing Corporation
 NEZP - Nezperce Railroad
 NFD  - Norfolk, Franklin and Danville Railway; Norfolk and Western Railway
 NFLZ - Flexi-Van Leasing
 NFPX - Newaygo Forest Products, Ltd.
 NGIX - Northern Grain, Inc.
 NGOU - Scoa, Inc.
 NGTX - Vangas, Inc.; Suburban Propane
 NH   - New York, New Haven and Hartford Railroad; CSX Transportation
 NHCR - New Hampshire Central Railroad
 NHN  - New Hampshire Northcoast Corporation
 NHRR - New Hope and Ivyland Railroad
 NHVT - New Hampshire and Vermont Railroad
 NHVX - National Railway Historical Society (East Carolina Chapter)
 NIAJ - Niagara Junction Railway; Conrail
 NIAX - Niagara and Western New York Railroad
 NICD - South Shore Line (NICTD)
 NICU - NIC Leasing, Inc.
 NICX - Niles Canyon Railway
 NIFX - GE Capital Rail Services
 NIHX - GE Capital Rail Services
 NIKX - NIK Non-stock Marketing Cooperative
 NIMX - Naporano (railroad division)
 NIRX - GE Capital Rail Services
 NITX - Nitram, Inc.
 NIWX - Northern Illinois and Wisconsin Railway
 NJ   - Niagara Junction Railway; Napierville Junction Railway; Canadian Pacific Railway; Delaware and Hudson Railway
 NJCX - New Jersey Rail Carrier, LLC.
 NJDX - GE Capital Rail Services
 NJRC - New Jersey Rail Carrier, LLC.
 NJII - New Jersey, Indiana and Illinois Railroad; Norfolk and Western Railway
 NJSL - New Jersey Seashore Lines; Cape May Seashore Lines
 NJT  - Newton Junction Terminal
 NJTR - New Jersey Transit
 NKCR - Nebraska, Kansas and Colorado Railway
 NKP  - New York, Chicago and St. Louis Railroad (Nickel Plate Road); Norfolk and Western Railway; Norfolk Southern
 NLAX - National Aeronautics and Space Administration (NASA)
 NLCL - Northern Lands Company Railway, Limited;
 NLG  - North Louisiana and Gulf Railroad; Kansas City Southern Railway
 NLIX - NL Industries, Inc.
 NLLX - Northern Line Layers
 NLPX - Perkins Motor Transport
 NLR  - Northern Lines Railway
 NLSU - Nautilus Leasing Services, Inc.
 NLSX - National Starch and Chemical Company
 NLSZ - Trans Ocean Chassis Corporation
 NLTX - National Starch and Chemical Company
 NLX  - Allied Chemical Canada
 NMCX - National Machinery Company
 NMGR - New Mexico Gateway Railroad
 NMLX - National Metal Corporation, Ltd.
 NMOR - Northern Missouri Railroad
 NMRX - New Mexico Department of Transportation - New Mexico Rail Runner Express
 NMSX - New Mexico Steam Locomotive and Railroad Historical Society
 NN   - Nevada Northern Railway; Northern Nevada Railroad
 NNIU - Nautica Line
 NNPU - Nigerian National Petroleum Corporation
 NNSX - Newport News Shipbuilding and Dry Dock Company
 NNW  - Nebraska Northwestern Railroad
 NNYX - National New York Central Railroad Museum
 NODM - Mexico North Western
 NOFU - Nodfos
 NOGC - New Orleans and Gulf Coast Railway
 NOKL - Northwestern Oklahoma Railroad
 NOKR - Northwestern Oklahoma Railroad
 NOKZ - First Union Rail
 NOLR - New Orleans Lower Coast Railroad
 NOLU - Neptune Orient Lines
 NOLZ - Neptune Orient Lines
 NOPB - New Orleans Public Belt Railroad
 NORM - Normetal
 NORX - Northern Indiana Public Service Company
 NOSU - Neptune Orient Lines
 NOT  - New Orleans Terminal
 NOTM - New Orleans, Texas and Mexico
 NOVX - Novell Polymers
 NOW  - Northern Ohio and Western Railway
 NP   - Northern Pacific Railway; Burlington Northern Railroad; Burlington Northern and Santa Fe Railway; BNSF Railway
 NPB  - Norfolk and Portsmouth Belt Line Railroad
 NPCX - Northern Petrochemical Company; Equistar Chemicals
 NPIX - Chem-Nuclear Systems, LLC
 NPPX - Nebraska Public Power District
 NPR  - Northern Plains Railroad
 NPRX - Yakima Interurban Lines Association
 NPSU - Nigel Parks, Ltd.
 NPT  - Portland Terminal Railroad (Oregon)
 NPTU - Neptune Leasing, Inc.
 NPTX - Newport Steel Corporation
 NRBX - Merchants Despatch Transportation Corporation; Fruit Growers Express
 NRC  - Merchants Despatch Transportation Corporation; National Refrigerator Car line
 NRCU - Nedlloyd Road Cargo
 NRCX - Northern Rail Car Corporation
 NRDX - Nordic Warehouse, Inc.
 NREX - National Railway Equipment Company
 NRHX - National Railway Historical Society
 NRI  - Nebkota Railway
 NRIX - National Refrigerants, Inc.
 NRLX - NorRail
 NRMX - National Railroad Museum
 NRNY - Northern Railroad (New York)
 NRPX - Northrop Corporation
 NRR  - Nobles Rock Railroad
 NRSU - Nippon Riku-un Sangyo Company
 NRTX - Regional Transportation Authority (Tennessee); Music City Star
 NS   - Norfolk Southern Railway (former); Southern Railway; Norfolk Southern Railway
 NSAX - National Steel Corporation
 NSC  - National Steel Car, Ltd.
 NSCT - Niagara, St. Catharines and Toronto Railway
 NSCX - National Steel Car Corporation
 NSFZ - Norfolk Southern Railway
 NSHR - North Shore Railroad
 NSL  - St. Lawrence and Raquette River Railroad
 NSLU - Norasia Services, Ltd.
 NSLZ - Nestle Transportation Company
 NSPX - Northern States Power Company
 NSPZ - Norfolk Southern Railway
 NSR  - Newburgh and South Shore Railroad
 NSRC - North Stratford Railroad
 NSRX - Jack Frost Cane Sugar
 NSS  - Newburgh and South Shore Railway
 NSSX - National Salvage and Service Corporation
 NSTX - North Star Steel Company
 NSXZ - Norfolk Southern Railway
 NSZ  - Norfolk Southern Railway
 NTIU - Germanischer Lloyd
 NTKX - VAE Nortrak North America, Inc.
 NTLX - Nashtex Leasing
 NTNU - National Container Network, Inc.
 NTR  - Natchez Trace Railroad; Mississippi Central Railroad
 NTRX - NTL Transportation Corporation
 NTRY - Nimishillen and Tuscarawas
 NTTX - TTX Company
 NTZR - Natchez Railway
 NUCX - Nucor Steel Crawfordsville (a division of Nucor Corporation)
 NUSU - Neptune Orient Lines
 NVCX - Nevada Cement Company
 NVPX - Nevada Power Company
 NVR  - Northern Vermont Railroad
 NVRR - Napa Valley Railroad
 NW   - Norfolk and Western Railway; Norfolk Southern
 NWAX - National Wax Company; BP Global Special Products, Inc.
 NWCX - Northwest Container Services, Inc.
 NWGX - Gorhams', Inc.
 NWLX - Nationwide Locomotive Service
 NWP  - Northwestern Pacific Railroad; Southern Pacific Railroad; Union Pacific Railroad
 NWR  - Nashville and Western Railroad
 NWRX - Niagara and Western Railway; Bergen Passaic Rail
 NWTX - North West Timber, Ltd.
 NWTZ - NW Transport
 NWX  - GE Rail Services
 NWZ  - Norfolk Southern Railway
 NX   - Mathieson Dry Ice
 NXLZ - National Xpress Logistics, Inc.
 NYA  - New York and Atlantic Railway
 NYAU - NYK Line
 NYBU - NYK Line
 NYC  - New York Central Railroad; Penn Central; CSX Transportation
 NYCH - New York Cross Harbor Railroad
 NYCN - New York Connecting Railroad
 NYCX - CSX Transportation
 NYD  - New York Dock Railway
 NYER - New York and Eastern Railway
 NYGL - New York and Greenwood Lake Railway
 NYKU - NYK Line
 NYKZ - NYK Line
 NYLB - New York and Long Branch Railroad; Conrail
 NYLE - New York and Lake Erie Railroad
 NYLU - Japan Line, Ltd.
 NYNJ - New York New Jersey Rail
 NYOG - New York and Ogdensburg Railway
 NYSW - New York, Susquehanna and Western Railway
 NYSX - New York State Electric and Gas Corporation
 NZCU - Shipping Corporation Of New Zealand, Ltd.
 NZSU - Shipping Corporation Of New Zealand, Ltd.
 NZX  - National Zinc Company

References
Reporting Marks: N

N